The 2023 NHL Heritage Classic (branded as the 2023 Tim Hortons NHL Heritage Classic for sponsorship reasons) is an upcoming outdoor regular season National Hockey League (NHL) game. The seventh game in the Heritage Classic series, it is scheduled to take place on October 29, 2023, at Commonwealth Stadium in Edmonton, with the Edmonton Oilers hosting the Calgary Flames. It will be the first outdoor game in the Battle of Alberta rivalry.

Background
During the "31 Thoughts" segment on the December 10, 2022, broadcast of Hockey Night in Canada, Elliotte Friedman initially reported that the NHL was planning a Heritage Classic game between the Edmonton Oilers and the Calgary Flames during the 2023–24 season, marking the 20th anniversary of the first Heritage Classic between the Montreal Canadiens and the Oilers at Commonwealth Stadium. While the 2003 game was held in November, Friedman stated that the league was aiming for October so the weather would be a little warmer. The league announced the game on December 31, 2022.

While this would be the first outdoor game in the Battle of Alberta rivalry, this would be the third one for each team.

References

External links 

NHL Heritage Classic, 2023
NHL Heritage Classic
Heritage Classic
Calgary Flames games
Edmonton Oilers games
Ice hockey competitions in Edmonton
2000s in Edmonton